This is a list of people from Peterborough, in Cambridgeshire. This list may include people from Greater Peterborough, an area which includes a number of surrounding villages. This list is arranged alphabetically by surname:

A
George Alcock – astronomer who was one of the most successful visual discoverers of novas and comets.
Annabelle Davis

B
 Andy Bell – lead singer of the English synth-pop duo Erasure
David Bentley – former Tottenham Hotspur and England footballer.
Paul Blades – footballer who played as a defender for Derby County, Norwich City and Wolves.
Peter Boizot – entrepreneur, restaurateur, politician, and philanthropist. Best known as the founder of PizzaExpress.

C
Lewis Church – cricketer
Walter Cornelius - strongman who escaped Communist Lithuania by swimming the Baltic Sea
John Clare - English poet

D
Joanna Dennehy, serial killer who murdered three men.

E
Jimmy Elliott – footballer who played for Tottenham and Brentford. Later worked as a football manager.

F
Gordon Fincham – former footballer who played for Leicester City, Plymouth Argyle and Luton Town.

G

H
Henry Hodge – English solicitor and Judge of the High Court of England and Wales.
Jake Humphrey – Journalist and television presenter for BT Sport.

J
Julian Joachim – former football player for Leicester City, Aston Villa and Coventry City.

L
Adrian Lyne – film director

M
Aston Merrygold – singer-songwriter

O
Matt Oakley – footballer who played for Southampton F.C. and Leicester City F.C.

P
Tom Plant – famous artist, part of the duo Plant & Frampton.
Luke Pasqualino - Actor. Starred in Our Girl and The Musketeers.

R
Henry Royce – founding partner in Rolls-Royce

S
 Louis Smith, (born 1989) – British artistic gymnast who specialises in the pommel horse.
 William Speechly (1735–1819), horticulturist
 Luke Steele – footballer who plays in goal for Barnsley F.C.

T
 Jodie Turner-Smith, (born 1986) – Actress and model

W
 Harry Wells, (born 1993) – rugby union player for Leicester Tigers

Z
 Steve Zenchuk, (born 1966) – former professional footballer

References

Notes

Bibliography

People from Peterborough
Peterborough